Eulimella polygyrata is a species of sea snail, a marine gastropod mollusk in the family Pyramidellidae, the pyrams and their allies.

Its type locality is the western bank of the Îles de Los.

References

Further reading

External links

polygyrata
Gastropods described in 1912